Andrésson may refer to:

Avdy Andresson (1899–1990), former Estonian Minister of War in exile
Axel Andrésson (1895–1961), pioneer of Icelandic football, founder of Víkingur FC
Axel Óskar Andrésson (born 1998), Icelandic professional footballer
Gunnar Andrésson (born 1970), Icelandic former Olympic handball player
Hlynur Andrésson (born 1993), Icelandic long-distance runner
Jökull Andrésson (born 2001), Icelandic professional footballer
Kristján Andrésson (born 1981), Swedish-born Icelandic retired handball player
Smiður Andrésson (died 1361), governor in Iceland with reputation for brutal methods in collecting taxes
Nils Andresson Lavik (1884–1966), Norwegian politician for the Christian Democratic Party

See also
Anderiesen
Andersen
Anderson (disambiguation)
Andersons (disambiguation)
Anderssen
Andersson
Andreasen
Andreassen
Andreasson
Andreessen (disambiguation)
Andresen
Andreson
Andriessen

Icelandic-language surnames